The 38th Legislative Assembly of Ontario was a legislature of the government of the Province of Ontario, Canada. It officially opened November 19, 2003, at Queen's Park in Toronto, and ended on June 5, 2007.  The membership was set by the 2003 Ontario general election on October 2, 2003, and it changed only somewhat due to resignations and by-elections.

It was controlled by a Liberal Party majority under Premier Dalton McGuinty.  The Official Opposition was the Progressive Conservative Party, led first by Ernie Eves, and later by John Tory.  The speaker was Michael A. Brown.

There were two sessions of the 38th Legislature:

Timeline of the 38th Parliament of Ontario
 November 19, 2003: The legislature conducted a secret vote to elect the Speaker of the legislature. Liberal Party of Ontario Member of Provincial Parliament (MPP) Alvin Curling is elected as Speaker. He was the first black Speaker of the Ontario legislature.
 March 24, 2004: Dominic Agostino, Liberal MPP for Hamilton East, died suddenly of liver cancer.
 May 13, 2004: A by-election was held in Hamilton East to replace Dominic Agostino. Ontario New Democratic Party candidate Andrea Horwath defeated Liberal candidate Ralph Agostino, Mr. Agostino's brother. This win returned the NDP to 8 seats and official party status.
 August 19, 2005: Speaker Alvin Curling resigned to accept an appointment as Ambassador to the Dominican Republic.
 November 24, 2005: In a by-election, Bas Balkissoon held the seat of Scarborough-Rouge River for the Liberals.
 September 18, 2006: Joe Cordiano, Liberal MPP for York South-Weston, resigned from cabinet and the legislature, citing a desire to spend more time with family.
 September 25, 2006: Tony Wong, Liberal MPP for Markham, resigned from the legislature to make a successful bid for a seat on York Regional Council.
 September 28, 2006: Cam Jackson, Progressive Conservative MPP for Burlington, resigned from the legislature to make a successful bid for the mayoralty of Burlington.
 February 8, 2007: Three by-elections were held.  Paul Ferreira won York South-Weston for the NDP (the seat was previously held by the Liberals); former Halton Region chair Joyce Savoline retained Burlington for the PCs; and Michael Chan held Markham for the Liberals.
 March 29, 2007: Tim Peterson, brother of former Ontario Premier David Peterson, left the Liberal caucus to sit as an Independent until the next election, in which he ran for the PCs.
 June 5, 2007: The 38th Parliament 2nd Session is prorogued.
 July 12, 2007: Liberal MPP Ernie Parsons resigned his seat in order to accept an appointment as Justice of the Peace.
 September 10, 2007: 38th Parliament dissolved.

Party standings

Seating Plan

P = Premier, LO = Leader of Opposition, L = Leader of the NDP.

List of members

 Cabinet ministers are in bold, leaders are in italics and the Speaker of the Legislature has a dagger next to his name.

External links
 Legislative Assembly of Ontario. 
 CBC.ca Nov. 19, 2003: Ontario names Curling as new Speaker

Terms of the Legislative Assembly of Ontario
2003 establishments in Ontario
2007 disestablishments in Ontario